Alois Kratzer (27 May 1907 – 11 September 1990) was a German ski jumper who competed in the 1928 Winter Olympics at St. Moritz. He was born in Rottach-Egern, Germany.

Titles
FIS Nordic World Ski Championships 1929 – 4th place on normal hill
1928 Winter Olympics – 19th place

References

1907 births
1990 deaths
German male ski jumpers
Olympic ski jumpers of Germany
Ski jumpers at the 1928 Winter Olympics
People from Miesbach (district)
Sportspeople from Upper Bavaria
20th-century German people